John Andrew Nerud (February 9, 1913 – August 13, 2015) was an American thoroughbred horse trainer and owner, who was inducted in the National Museum of Racing and Hall of Fame in 1972.

Early years
Nerud, who was born on a ranch in Minatare, Nebraska, worked as a rodeo cowboy, groom and most notably as a trainer during his youth. Prior to serving in World War II, he was the agent for Hall of Fame jockey Ted Atkinson in New England. He served with the United States Navy during the war, then returned to racing as an assistant to Frank J. Kearns at Woolford Farm. He eventually took over from Kearns and in 1949 trained his first Champion when Delegate earned American Co-Champion Sprint Horse honors.

Career
Nerud spent the bulk of his 44-year training career (1935–1978) as a trainer, president and general manager for William L. McKnight's Tartan Farms in Ocala, Florida. When Nerud retired from training in 1978, he remained at Tartan as manager of racing and breeding.

As a trainer, Nerud first drew national attention in 1956 after prepping Switch On to win the Palm Beach and McLennan Handicaps.  The following season, in 1957, Nerud lost the Kentucky Derby by a nose to Iron Liege after jockey Bill Shoemaker, aboard Gallant Man, misjudged the finish line. Gallant Man later defeated Bold Ruler in a record-breaking Belmont Stakes.

Nerud's most acclaimed runner was Hall of Fame inductee Dr. Fager. In 1968 Dr. Fager became the only thoroughbred to win four Championships in one year: Sprinter, Turf Horse, Handicap Horse and Horse of the Year. In addition to Delegate, Nerud trained champions Intentionally (1959 Sprinter) Ta Wee (1969, 1970 Sprinter and also a Hall of Fame inductee) and Dr. Patches (1978 co-Sprinter). Overall, he is credited with saddling over 1,000 winners including 27 stakes winners.

Nerud helped turn Tartan into one of the nation's top racing and breeding operations. In addition to developing an excellent broodmare band, Tartan stood Dr. Fager, Intentionally, In Reality and later, Hold Your Peace, Codex and Smile. Nerud also bred and owned Fappiano, sire of the champion and top stallion Unbridled.

Founding director of Breeders' Cup
During the early 1980s, Nerud assisted in the early development of the Breeders' Cup, helping founder John R. Gaines to sell the concept to horsemen across the nation. As a founding member, Nerud also served as chairman of the Breeders' Cup marketing committee in its formative years. In 1985 Nerud won the Breeders' Cup Mile with his homebred Cozzene, who was trained by his son Jan. Cozzene was voted the 1985 Eclipse Award for Outstanding Male Turf Horse.

Personal life
Nerud's wife of 68 years, Charlotte, died on August 28, 2009. John was a resident of Old Brookville, New York, and turned 100 in February 2013. Nerud remained a director emeritus of Breeders' Cup, Ltd. until his death. Nerud died on August 13, 2015, at the age of 102.

References

1913 births
2015 deaths
United States Navy personnel of World War II
American horse trainers
American racehorse owners and breeders
Eclipse Award winners
United States Thoroughbred Racing Hall of Fame inductees
Sportspeople from Nebraska
American centenarians
Men centenarians
People from Scotts Bluff County, Nebraska